Lost Themes is the debut studio album by American film director and composer John Carpenter. It was released on February 3, 2015, through Sacred Bones Records. Carpenter created Lost Themes in collaboration with his son Cody Carpenter and his godson Daniel Davies. While Lost Themes is his first stand-alone album, Carpenter has composed numerous critically acclaimed soundtracks for films since the 1970s, including for the films Assault on Precinct 13, Halloween, and Escape from New York.

Background
On the album's production and recording, Carpenter stated:

Critical reception

Upon its release, Lost Themes received positive reviews from music critics. At Metacritic, which assigns a normalized rating out of 100 to reviews from critics, the album received an average score of 74, which indicates "generally favorable reviews", based on 12 reviews. Writing for AllMusic, Heather Phares stated that "a big part of Lost Themes brilliance lies in Carpenter's refusal to update his aesthetic -- the more '80s it is, the more vital it sounds." She also further commented: "As he leaps from one thrill to the next, he evokes his past without rehashing it, delivering a complete and immensely satisfying portrait of his music along the way." Consequence of Sound critic Dan Bogosian thought that "Carpenter’s limited instrumentation started as a strength," writing:  "these Lost Themes could stand with any of his horror soundscapes." Exclaim! critic Cam Lindsay described the album as "a brand new soundtrack that doesn't require a film" and observed: "Carpenter knows exactly how to appease his fans, and with Lost Themes, he has given them just what they want."  Aaron Leitko of Pitchfork wrote: "Lost Themes is plenty dark and heavy but shorter on inspiration." Andy Beta of Rolling Stone was mixed in his assessment of the album, stating: "The icy synths of "Vortex" and "Fallen" evoke vintage Carpenter dread, but the prog-pomp of "Domain" and "Mystery" are the aural equivalent of too much CGI."

Charts
The album debuted at number 44 on the UK Albums Chart. Stateside, Lost Themes peaked at #129 on Billboard 200.

Track listing

Personnel
 John Carpenter – composition, performance, engineering
 Cody Carpenter – composition, performance, engineering
 Daniel Davies – composition, performance, engineering
 Jay Shaw – design
 Kyle Cassidy – photography

References

External links
 

2015 debut albums
John Carpenter albums
Sacred Bones Records albums